The Army Postal Service (APS) functions as a government-operated military mail system in India. A primary feature of Army Postal Service systems is that normally they are subsidized to ensure that military mail posted between duty stations abroad and the home country (or vice versa) does not cost the sender any more than normal domestic mail traffic. In some cases, Indian military personnel in a combat zone may post letters and/or packages to the home country for free, while in others, senders located in a specific overseas area may send military mail to another military recipient, also located in the same overseas area, without charge. Officers are deputed primarily from the Indian Postal Service and from the Army Corps. Army Postal Service is the only service that enables civil service officers to work in the armed forces.

Activities
Army Postal Service provides Postal, Remittance, Savings & Insurance services to Army, Indian Navy, Air Force and Paramilitary forces personnel through 500 Field Post Offices established across the country. It also provides cover to Indian troops deployed with United Nations Peace Keeping Forces abroad.

Organisational set-up
The head of Army Postal Service is the Additional Director General, Army Postal Service at Army Headquarters in the rank of Major General. He is assisted by Deputy Director General, Army Postal Service in the rank of Brigadier at Army Headquarters.

The two Command Based Post Offices at Delhi and Kolkata and Army Postal Service Centre at Kamptee, Nagpur are commanded by commandants in the rank of colonel. The Officers Commanding Corps/Divisional/Area/Border Roads/Assam Rifles/Air Force Postal Units in the rank of Lt Col/ Major/Captain monitor the functioning of Field Post Offices (FPOs) under their control and discharge the functions of the Postal Advisor to the General-Officer-Commanding. Two Central Base Post Offices and Section Base Post Offices serve as the nodal points for mail processing. The Central Base Post Offices are 56 and 99 APO operating out of New Delhi (No. 1 CBPO) and Kolkata (No. 2 CBPO), respectively.  99 APO covers all formations in the eight north-eastern states, West Bengal and the Andaman and Nicobar Islands through its network of nearly 130 FPOs. 56 APO covers the rest of the country through its network of 50 FPOs.

Badge
The current badge of the Army Postal Service was approved in February 1978. The badge consists of a flying swan (Raj Hans) encased by a wheat stalk wreath in a semi-oval shape. The wheat stalk signifies growth and prosperity. The 'Raj Hans' is a mythical bird messenger, representing the function of mail handling by the Corps. The words 'Mail-Milap' (which means 'union through mail') and 'Sena Dak Seva' in Hindi are embodied on scrolls in the badge.

Head of Army Postal Service

References

Administrative corps of the Indian Army
Army logistics units and formations
Postal system of India
Military mail